The Phyllis Rampton Narrow Gauge Railway Trust is a British charity which is registered with the British Charity Commission as 292240 under the classification of "Education/Training Environment/Conservation/Heritage". The Trust is the 100% shareholder of the Vale of Rheidol Railway in Wales and was established to both protect the future of the railway and provide funds to build a museum at Aberystwyth station.

Policy and objectives 

The Trust's 2006 annual report states:

The objectives shall be to preserve, exhibit, display and loan for demonstration for the public benefit and for the advancement of technical, historical and general education, steam and other railway locomotives, rolling stock, equipment, machines and relics which are historical, operational and of general interest and in addition are of educational value. The objective of the charity is also the preservation, maintenance and promotion of narrow gauge railways.

Vale of Rheidol Locomotive Workshop
In June 2010 the trust provided £600,000 towards building a new restoration workshop at Aberystwyth. The workshop building, completed in 2014 is a major asset to the railway and now employs a number of skilled craftsmen and apprentices. The workshop has completed the restoration of a number of locomotives as well as carrying out maintenance of the Vale of Rheidol fleet. The workshop regularly holds open days.

Collection of locomotives 

It is a common misconception that the Trust owns a large collection of locomotives. Vale of Rheidol Railway Ltd does however own a number of locomotives, which are stored on the railway in the Vale of Rheidol Museum Collection. Most of these locomotives are not currently on public view.

Additionally Vale of Rheidol Railway Chairman, Mr Peter Rampton, privately owns a number of locomotives. These are not on public view.

See also

Vale of Rheidol Railway
List of Vale of Rheidol Railway rolling stock

References 

Rail transport preservation in the United Kingdom
Vale of Rheidol Railway